was a sumo wrestler from Minamiakita District, Akita, Japan. He made his professional debut in 1937. He fought in the top makuuchi division for 16 tournaments and his highest rank was maegashira 3. He was a member of Nishonoseki stable and recruited the future yokozuna Wakanohana Kanji I while still an active wrestler. After his retirement from active competition in 1952 he became an elder of the Japan Sumo Association under the name Hanakago and established the Hanakago stable, taking Wakanohana with him. He was later the coach of yokozuna Wajima, who eventually married Hanakago's daughter and took over control of the stable shortly before Hanakago's death in 1981.

In 1951 he took part in an exhibition tournament in Los Angeles, the first visit by professional sumo wrestlers to the United States since World War II, alongside Yakatayama, Fujitayama and retired former yokozuna Maedayama.

Career record

References

1916 births
1981 deaths
Japanese sumo wrestlers
Sumo people from Akita Prefecture